The Cranbrook Bucks are a junior "A" ice hockey team based in Cranbrook, British Columbia, Canada. They are members of the Interior Conference of the British Columbia Hockey League (BCHL). They play their home games at Western Financial Place.

History
On October 8, 2019, the BCHL awarded the city of Cranbrook and an ownership group led by former Kootenay Ice goaltender Nathan Lieuwen an expansion franchise to begin play during the 2020–21 BCHL season.

The franchise was a replacement tenant for Western Financial Place, after the Western Hockey League's Kootenay Ice franchise relocated to Winnipeg, Manitoba prior to the start of the 2019-20 WHL season.

Season-by-season record
Note: GP = Games played, W = Wins, L = Losses, OTL = Overtime losses, SOL = Shootout losses, GF = Goals for, GA = Goals against

The 2020–21 BCHL season was shortened to 20 games and played in a "pod" format with no playoffs held due to the COVID-19 pandemic. Cranbook played in the Penticton "pod" along with the Penticton Vees and Trail Smoke Eaters.

References

External links
 

2019 establishments in British Columbia
British Columbia Hockey League teams
Cranbrook, British Columbia
Ice hockey clubs established in 2019
Ice hockey teams in British Columbia